April Rose Wilkens (born April 25, 1970) is the subject of the podcast series Panic Button: The April Wilkens Case, started in 2022. Wilkens is an American woman serving a life sentence at Mabel Bassett Correctional Center in Oklahoma for killing her ex-fiancé and abuser, Terry Carlton, the son of a multimillionaire in Tulsa, Oklahoma. She was one of the first women to use battered woman syndrome an Oklahoma trial, and claimed to have acted in self defense,  but it did not work in her favor and she was still found guilty by a jury. Local Tulsa news stations still to this day are hesitant to cover her case due to Carlton's family owning and operating dealerships which buy ad time from them. Her case caused an "outcry from those who say she acted because of battered woman syndrome." As of 2022, she was going into her 25th year of incarceration.

Wilkens is featured as starting head of the dog rehabilitation and adoption program in Mabel Basset in the 2015 student documentary Bassett Tails by Friends for Folks. She also leads a physical health training program at the prison. In 2022, her case was picked up by the Oklahoma Appleseed Center for Law and Justice under the Network for the Appleseed Foundation after continued denials of parole. The OK Appleseed Center "will be raising awareness about April's case in hopes she will one day be set free." They are using Wilkens's story to lobby "Oklahoma lawmakers to draft and pass a bill that would let courts resentence certain survivors of abuse—specifically, ones whose crimes were related to the domestic violence they experienced." Wilkens will not be eligible for parole again until 2025.

Personal life 
April Wilkens grew up in Kellyville, Oklahoma. Her father was abusive and that may have led to her feeling like abuse from Terry Carlton was normal. She met Carlton at his car dealership, Don Carlton Acura, and for their first date he flew her to Dallas on a private plane. They lived about 8 blocks from each other "in the prominent Brookside neighborhood of Tulsa." In early April 1998, Terry took April to his house at gunpoint and held her hostage, one of many incidents of abuse before his killing. She was a single mother when it happened and, according to her own words, Carlton previously threatened to kill her son.

Case and conviction 
April Wilkens shot Terry Carlton eight times on April 28, 1998, in his Tulsa house. Leading up to the final confrontation, Terry had stalked, beaten, and raped April Wilkens several times prior. They both had used illegal substances before the killing, Carlton coercing Wilkens to and also raping her. The Tulsa World reported that during a search of Carlton's residence that night, "five live grenades were found in the basement, which apparently was used as a 'music room'" and the bomb squad had to be called in. "Rifles, shotguns, and a small quantity of narcotics also were found in the residence." She had filed her first protective order against Carlton in November 1996, after he had attacked her in Rome. A second protective order had been filed after they went to Greece, according to court records. Carlton had also filed suit for breach of contract against Wilkens over an engagement ring not returned, asking in excess of $10,000. In Feb 21, 1998, he was charged with transporting a loaded firearm, but failed to appear in court on March 25, 1998. The Tulsa world also reported that the "case drew immediate attention" because Wilkens's defense, battered woman syndrome, was "fairly new and virtually untested in Oklahoma courts."  April Wilkens did not take a gun to the house, and stayed there after the killing until police arrived, covering the body with a blanket and making no attempt to make it look like someone else committed the killing. This was consistent with her statement that "she did not feel she did anything wrong." A neighbor told the jury that April appeared to want to leave town the night before the killing. April Wilkens was 29 years old when she was convicted of first-degree murder.

Terry Carlton took April Wilkens on lavish trips and on one occasion attacked her when they were in the Netherlands in 1996. Carlton was the son of a multimillionaire in Tulsa, Oklahoma, whose father, Don Carlton, was involved with a bribery scandal at Honda. Don Carlton later sued April for amount of actual and punitive damages after the trial, but later dropped the charges. Before trial, the Carltons also agreed to a plea deal of 20 years, but April did not take it, believing she would be found innocent, but it shows that the Carltons are not worried about her as a threat. She has served over 20 years now.

Terry Carlton bragged about paying off the police when April would report his abuse, and the Tulsa police did not enforce a warrant for his arrest, either, before his death. Tulsa Police would laugh when they would arrive at the scene, saying that she called them so often they eventually thought they would find Wilkens dead. Carlton also owned a police scanner, so he would leave before they got there. Terry Carlton was the uncle of Justin Carlton Bruton, a suspect in the murder of Anastasia WitbolsFeugen, and supporters of April released evidence dating back to 2008 that Terry Carlton and the Bruton/Carlton family believed that Justin Bruton, not the convicted Byron Case, killed Anastasia and then himself. Terry used WitbolsFeugen's death to intimidate April Wilkens, according to her legal documents. This information was not allowed in court during her trial, but would have shown her reasoning for believing her life was in danger. April Wilkens also recorded Terry Carlton admitting to abusing and raping her, but it was never played at trial, though the then-DA, Tim Harris should have had a copy since she gave one to the Tulsa Police. A juror after the trial claimed that April was not a good test case for Battered Woman Syndrome, which was untested in Oklahoma courts at the time, and Assistant District Attorney Sharon Ashe claimed "Wilkens is not a classic example of a battered woman." The DA "argued that drug abuse, not domestic abuse, made Wilkens snap." During jury selection for the trail, Tim Harris told the jury that he was "not here to win or lose, but to tell the truth," which some attorneys analyzing the case later criticized, saying he "absolutely had a motive to be there" and it put April in an impossible situation to have to refute. Harris could have chosen not to file charges against her in the first place.

Wilkens later got her former counselor and Battered Woman Syndrome expert, Lynda Driskell, to sign an affidavit saying that Wilkens's attorney never contacted a key witness for her trial and Driskell also said April's story was consistent with being a battered woman. What is more, a tape where Carlton admitted to raping and abusing her was never played in court and a key witness, Clare Eagan, now a federal judge but a previous attorney for Wilkens, was never asked to testify,  leading some to believe Wilkens was poorly represented at her trial. The expert on Battered Woman Syndrome who Wilkens's attorney, Chris Lyons hired was named Dr. John Call. He previously served at DVIS on the board and his contributions to the trial, as well as his expertise, in that area have been questioned by current experts in the field.

Post-conviction actions 
Wilkens "filed an application for Post-Conviction Relief in 2003 and 2009, stating her attorney failed to present key evidence on her behalf" and that then-DA Tim Harris "should have been disqualified from prosecuting her case due to this personal relationship with Don Carlton, who afterward contributed to his political campaigns and even held a public reception for him." Harris is the same DA who is associated with the now-exonerated Michelle Murphy and Corey Atchison. A former judge on the Oklahoma Court of Criminal Appeals, Charles Johnson, who recused himself only once on Wilkens's appeals but not for other times, officiated the wedding of Don Carlton and his wife in 1996 (before Terry Carlton's death) and Carlton's granddaughter, Jennifer Elizabeth Bruton.

In March 2022, Wilkens was denied a parole hearing by the Oklahoma Pardon and Parole Board despite being granted a hearing in past applications for parole. Scott Williams, Richard Smothermon, and Edward Konieczny voted against her while Larry Morris was the only board member to vote yes. This came only days after the only woman on the board, Kelly Doyle, resigned. The same all-male board at the time that denied her a parole hearing recommended the Crossbow Killer, Jimmie Stohler, be granted parole in the same meeting. Larry Morris has worked in the past with federal judge Clare Eagan, who wrote a 2005 affidavit in support of April Wilkens. It was later uncovered that the current Tulsa DA's office of Steve Kunzweiler protested her parole with a letter stating that they saw her as a threat to public safety and that, if she were sentenced with the same conviction today, she would not be eligible for parole for another 17 years due to changes in sentencing for first-degree murder. This overlooks the fact that another woman's Oklahoma case, shortly after Wilkens's trial, argued the same defense (Battered Woman Syndrome) after killing her husband in his sleep, was sentenced to only four years only to have that conviction overturned a year later. Steve Kunzewiler's wife also donated to the previous Tim Harris campaign and Kunzweiler worked under Tim Harris.

Tulsa Public Radio reported that, according to one of Wilkens's attorneys, Leslie Briggs, that April was denied parole "partly because Carlton’s well-connected father, Don Carlton, protested at the parole board hearings." Don Carlton died in January 2022, before Wilkens was denied by the board in March 2022 "the more in-depth hearing where Carlton had previously spoken against her release. Briggs said it was the first time Wilkens had ever been denied a second step hearing in the parole process." On September 30, 2022, McCarty and Briggs filed Post Conviction Relief for April Wilkens, claiming that evidence was suppressed during trial, resulting in a brady violation.     Before the filing, Tim Harris was accused of taking campaign contributions from the Brutons and Carltons, family Terry Carlton, and suppressing other evidence not mentioned in the filing. Her relief was denied, and in February 2023, they filed an appeal.

Campaign and post-conviction news coverage 
In mid 2022, Leslie Briggs and Colleen McCarty started a podcast where April Wilkens was the subject, with the intent that "listeners should expect case details in upcoming episodes that the jury in the trial never got to hear.". It is estimated that around 500 other women are incarcerated in Oklahoma like April Wilkens related to their circumstance of being abused, a "phenomenon of criminalized survivors in Oklahoma prisons." The podcast, called “Panic Button," is titled so because "'during the Spring of 1998, April wore a panic button around her neck that would have triggered her home alarm from anywhere." Even Brittany Harlow, who covered April's Wilken case right before the podcast launched, has learned new aspects of the case through the podcast. A week after the podcast released the first episode, it had "over 1,000 listeners, is currently the number one non-profit podcast on the app Goodpods and in the top 5% of all podcasts." Oklahoma’s criminal code, like most U.S. states, does not "offer reduced sentencing for abuse survivors. Only Illinois and New York have such a law" and it was reported in 2021 "that they rarely result in shorter sentences." This legislation could also help women sentenced under failure to protect laws.

The podcast wrapped up with a live panel at Tulsa's Center for Public Secrets. The Carltons never responded to the podcast hosts' request for an interview or comment.

Oklahoma Domestic Abuse Survivorship Act 
In a mid-September 2022 Oklahoma House interim study brought by Representative Toni Hasenbeck, Wilkens's story was used to explain the need for new legislation that could give second look resentencing to many currently in Oklahoma prisons.     In January 2023, Hasenbeck authored and filed HB 1639 that "would allow a survivor to enter into a lesser sentencing range when evidence of abuse has been substantiated"   and offers "offers nuance in sentencing." At least 156 women at Mabel Bassett write "letters claiming to have experienced intimate partner violence at the time their crime was committed." The bill was originally called the Universal Defense Act, and the attorney general Drummond seems supportive of solutions the bill attempts to address. Hasenbeck has said “For whatever reason women have this problem in the court system that they end up with larger prison sentences then typically the men that were producing the acts to lead to the final act." Colleen McCarty says that legislation is necessary becuase the parole process has not helped Wilkens and other women. Wilkens has never been able to "use the evidence of her domestic abuse in her appeal for early release." 

On March 1st, 2023, the bill unanimously passed the Oklahoma House Judiciary—Criminal Committee. The Sentencing Project thanked the members for passing the bill out of committee. The committee members included Rande Worthen (chair), Collin Dule, John George, Jason Lowe, Stan May, Lonnie Sims, and Judd Strom. After the bill passed committee, Wilkens was quoted as saying on a phone interview that “So many women in prison with me here have told me just chilling stories about the abuse they’ve suffered too before coming here."  

Before and after the bill passed committee, advocates for Wilkens and other criminalized survivors visited the capitol to speak with legislators and contuct art projects. Though the bill passed committee, Hasenbeck did strike the title of the bill, which allows changes to be made to the language of the bill. A similar bill was passed in California.

See also
 Byron Case
 Clare Eagan
 Tim Harris 
 Steve Kunzweiler 
 Oklahoma Pardon and Parole Board

References

External links 
 https://aprilwilkensblog.wordpress.com/
 http://www.stasia.org/case_against/
 http://freebyroncase.com/

1970 births
Living people
American people convicted of murder
Convict
People convicted of murder by Oklahoma